Zaborów may refer to the following places in Poland:
Zaborów, Lower Silesian Voivodeship (south-west Poland)
Zaborów, Piotrków County in Łódź Voivodeship (central Poland)
Zaborów, Gmina Uniejów in Łódź Voivodeship (central Poland)
Zaborów, Gmina Zadzim in Łódź Voivodeship (central Poland)
Zaborów, Lesser Poland Voivodeship (south Poland)
Zaborów, Subcarpathian Voivodeship (south-east Poland)
Zaborów, Grójec County in Masovian Voivodeship (east-central Poland)
Zaborów, Siedlce County in Masovian Voivodeship (east-central Poland)
Zaborów, Warsaw West County in Masovian Voivodeship (east-central Poland)